Tadeusz Friedrich (7 July 1903 – 10 October 1976) was a Polish fencer. He won a bronze medal in the team sabre event at the 1928 and 1932 Summer Olympics. Friedrich fought in the Warsaw Uprising in 1944. After the war he stayed in Kraków, where he worked as a sport coach. His wife was Felicja Schabińska, Polish athlete and Olympian.

References

External links 
 Profile at the Polish Olympic Committee

1903 births
1976 deaths
Polish male fencers
Olympic fencers of Poland
Fencers at the 1928 Summer Olympics
Fencers at the 1932 Summer Olympics
Olympic bronze medalists for Poland
Olympic medalists in fencing
Warsaw Uprising insurgents
Medalists at the 1928 Summer Olympics
Medalists at the 1932 Summer Olympics
Sportspeople from Nowy Sącz
People from the Kingdom of Galicia and Lodomeria
20th-century Polish people